Cardozo is a Spanish or Portuguese surname. 

Cardozo may also refer to:

 U Street (Washington, D.C.) or Cardozo, a street and neighborhood in Washington, D.C.
 U Street station, a Washington Metro station formerly named "U Street-Cardozo"
 Benjamin N. Cardozo School of Law, Yeshiva University, New York City

See also
Cardozo High School (disambiguation)
Cardoza, related surname
Cardoso (disambiguation), modern Portuguese spelling